Julio Sabas Jiménez Llanque (5 December 1964 – 6 July 2020) was a Bolivian politician who served as a Deputy since 22 January 2015. He died from COVID-19 in Cochabamba during the COVID-19 pandemic in Bolivia on 6 July 2020, aged 55.

References

1964 births
2020 deaths
Members of the Chamber of Deputies (Bolivia)
21st-century Bolivian politicians
Deaths from the COVID-19 pandemic in Bolivia